The 2001 Asian Youth Boys Volleyball Championship was held in Mellat Sport Complex, Isfahan, Iran from 1 to 8 April 2001.

Pools composition
The teams are seeded based on their final ranking at the 1999 Asian Youth Boys Volleyball Championship.

Preliminary round

Pool A

|}

|}

Pool B

|}

|}

Classification 9th–10th

|}

Final round

Quarterfinals

|}

5th–8th semifinals

|}

Semifinals

|}

7th place

|}

5th place

|}

3rd place

|}

Final

|}

Final standing

Team Roster
Mohammad Soleimani, Davoud Moghbeli, Shahriar Bahrami, Mohammad Reza Fadaei, Mohsen Andalib, Mahmoud Tavanaei, Rouhollah Kolivand, Behzad Behnejad, Mehdi Mahdavi, Farhad Zarif, Mehdi Farahdoust, Mikaeil Yolmeh
Head Coach: Mostafa Karkhaneh

Awards
MVP:  Mohammad Soleimani
Best Scorer:  Kang Dong-jin
Best Spiker:  Mohammad Soleimani
Best Blocker:  Davoud Moghbeli
Best Server:  Kang Dong-jin
Best Setter:  Song Byung-il
Best Digger:  Farhad Zarif
Best Receiver:  Liu Hsiung

References
 www.jva.or.jp

External links
FIVB

A
V
Asian Boys' U18 Volleyball Championship
International volleyball competitions hosted by Iran